The Ladies Stakes is a historic American Thoroughbred horse race for Fillies and Mares four years of age and older held annually at Aqueduct Racetrack in Queens, New York. Inaugurated at the Jerome Park Racetrack in 1868, it is the oldest stakes race in the United States exclusively for fillies and mares. An unlisted stakes race, it is currently run on or about New Year's Day  and offers a purse of $100,000.

From its beginnings in 1868 through 1912 the race was restricted to three-year-old fillies then from 1913 through 1938, it was made open to fillies of any age. Since 1939, it has been open to older fillies and mares. There was no race in 1895 and also none in 1911 and 1912, as a result of the New York State Legislature passage of the Hart–Agnew Law in 1908 which banned wagering and led to the shut down of all racing in the state. In 2006, the race was not run due to the shortage of entrants and as a result of  NYRA financial reorganization, neither was it run in 2009.

The Ladies Handicap has been won by some notable females in American racing history including Hall of Fame inductees Firenze, Miss Woodford, Beldame, Maskette, Top Flight and Shuvee.

The Ladies Handicap has also been run at:
 Jerome Park Racetrack: 1868–1890
 Morris Park Racecourse: 1890–1904
 Belmont Park: 1905–1958, 1960

Records
Speed record
 1:49.78 @ 1-1/8 miles: Teen Pauline (2014) 
 1:36.40 @ 1 mile: Red Eye (1939)
 2:01.40 @ 1-1/4 miles: Bastonera II (1976), Transient Trend (1995)
 2:29.40 @ 1-1/2 miles: Goofed (1963)
 2:58.25 @ 1-5/8 miles: Katie Pease 1873)

Most wins
 Black Maria (1926, 1927)
 Strolling Belle (1999, 2000)

Most wins by a jockey
 6 – Ángel Cordero Jr. (1968, 1970, 1973, 1976, 1981, 1988)

Most wins by a trainer
 4 – Jacob Pincus (1872, 1875, 1876, 1880)
 4 – R. Wyndham Walden (1877, 1879, 1881, 1894)
 4 – John C. Kimmel (1998, 1999, 2000, 2004)

Most wins by an owner
 5 – August Belmont (1872, 1875, 1876, 1880, 1889)

Winners

* In 2000, Pentatonic won the race, but was disqualified and set back to second.
 In 1974, Poker Night won the race, but was disqualified and set back to second.
 In 1970, Manta won the race, but was disqualified and set back to second.

References

Horse races in New York (state)
Ungraded stakes races in the United States
Mile category horse races for fillies and mares
Sports competitions in New York City
Recurring sporting events established in 1868
Aqueduct Racetrack
Morris Park Racecourse
Jerome Park Racetrack